For the 1978 memoir of the same name, see Martha Gellhorn.

Travels with Myself and Another is the second studio album by Future of the Left.

Background
Around summer 2008, the band started performing new tracks such as "Drink Nike" and "The Hope That House Built" at live shows. An additional 3 new songs ("VDFA," "Cloak the Dagger," and "Distant Jabs at a Soul," the last of which contains an instrumental section nearly identical to the ending of "Stand by Your Manatee") were captured on the live album Last Night I Saved Her from Vampires. In November 2008, the band cancelled the rest of their tour dates for the year in order to finish writing the second record. It was recorded at several sessions in studios in Wales and was released on 22 June 2009 on 4AD.

The track listing was confirmed by Andy Falkous on 27 March 2009, in a blog post on the band's MySpace page.

The album was leaked online on 22 April, eight weeks before its release date. Falkous, posting a blog on the subject, said: "I'm not angry (in fact I don't blame you, unless you leaked it, in which case I WILL KILL YOU), just a little worried that the record we made will get lost amongst the debris and leave us playing shows [...] - fifteen people and a world of disillusion."

On 18 May, a pre-ordering system was set up on the band's website which allowed an immediate download of the album, with the CD or LP being sent out closer to the June release date.

Reception

The album was awarded a 9/10 score by Clash Music, with the review instructing the reader to "just buy a copy, and PLAY IT FUCKING LOUD." The NME also gave the album a positive review, awarding a rating of 8/10. Ben Patashnik writes: "Travels... feels like a product of 2009, a coruscating reaction to everything that makes us mad but which is never self-righteous or preachy." Andrew P Street of Time Out Sydney concluded "Let's draw a line in the sand right here, people: either this is your favourite album of this year, or you're just plain wrong."

Track listing
"Arming Eritrea" - 2:57
"Chin Music" - 1:56
"The Hope That House Built" - 3:41
"Throwing Bricks at Trains" - 2:36
"I Am Civil Service" - 2:17
"Land of My Formers" - 2:47
"You Need Satan More Than He Needs You" - 2:46
"That Damned Fly" - 2:07
"Stand by Your Manatee" - 2:08
"Yin / Post-Yin" - 2:54
"Drink Nike" - 2:33
"Lapsed Catholics" - 4:15

Accolades

(*) designates unordered lists.

References

External links
Interview with Falco about the making of this album at The-Fly.co.uk

2009 albums
Future of the Left albums
4AD albums